Rudi Valentine Webster (born 10 June 1939) is a Barbadian cricketer, medical doctor, sports psychologist and diplomat.

Cricket career
Webster was born in Marchfield, Saint Philip, Barbados. Between 1961 and 1968 he appeared in 70 first-class matches as a right-handed batsman and right-arm fast-medium bowler, representing Scotland, Warwickshire and Otago. He played his first first-class match for Scotland in 1961, while studying medicine at the University of Edinburgh. Playing against the Marylebone Cricket Club, he took 11 wickets in the match, including a wicket with the first ball he bowled in each innings. 

In 1963, playing for Warwickshire after his medical studies finished for the year, Webster took 77 wickets in 17 matches in the County Championship at an average of 17.44, forming the fieriest opening attack in the competition with another student, Roger Edmonds. In his first Championship match in 1964, after completing his medical studies, he took 7 for 6 and 5 for 52 in Warwickshire's victory over Yorkshire.

In late 1966 Webster moved to New Zealand, taking up a two-year appointment in the radiology department at Dunedin Hospital. He played two seasons of Plunket Shield cricket for Otago, taking 23 wickets in seven first-class matches at an average of 24.00. He played no further first-class cricket.

Later career
Webster managed the West Indian team that played World Series Cricket between 1977 and 1979. From the late 1970s to the mid-1980s he was a successful team motivator with the premiership teams Carlton and Richmond in the Victorian Football League. He later worked with international cricket teams as a sports psychologist. He has written two books on the subject: Winning Ways: In Search of Your Best Performance (1985) and Think Like a Champion (2013).

He served as Barbados's Ambassador to the United States from 1991 to 1995.

In March 2012, the Indian Premier League franchise Kolkata Knight Riders appointed Webster as their mental skills coach for the fifth season of the IPL. They won the tournament.

References

External links
 

1939 births
Living people
People from Saint Philip, Barbados
Barbadian cricketers
Warwickshire cricketers
Otago cricketers
Scotland cricketers
Alumni of the University of Edinburgh Medical School
Sports psychologists
Ambassadors of Barbados to the United States